The 1970–71 Carolina Cougars season was the 2nd season of the Cougars in the ABA. The Cougars finished dead last in the Eastern Division, though they missed the playoffs by 3 games. They finished 8th in point per game at 115.3 points per game, while finishing 6th in points allowed at 119.4 points per game. The team faltered near the end of the season, losing 11 straight games from February 25 to March 19. Their biggest win streak was 3, which they accomplished 5 times in the season.

During the regular season, the Cougars played 18 games in Greensboro, 12 in Charlotte, and 12 in Raleigh.

Roster  
 31 Gary Bradds - Forward
 27 Joe Caldwell - Small forward
 13 Frank Card - Small forward
 34 Mack Daughtry - Guard
 33 Ira Harge - Center
 12 Rich Johnson - Point forward
 -- Arvesta Kelly - Guard
 13 Lonnie Kluttz - Forward
 21 George Lehmann - Point guard
 23 Gene Littles - Point guard
 22 Chuck Lloyd - Center / Forward
 35 Randolph Mahaffey - Power forward
 44 Larry Miller - Shooting guard
 24 Dave Newmark - Center
 51 George Peeples - Center
 11 Bob Verga - Shooting guard
 14 Vann Williford - Small forward

Final standings

Eastern Division

Awards, records, and honors
1971 ABA All-Star Game played on January 23, 1971 at Greensboro Coliseum in Greensboro, North Carolina.
 Joe Caldwell

References

 Cougars on Basketball Reference

Carolina
Carolina Cougars
Carolina Cougars, 1970-71
Carolina Cougars, 1970-71